Braine is a commune in the department of Aisne in Hauts-de-France in northern France.

History
Braine existed long before the year 561, when it was mentioned as a royal palace of Neustrian King Chlotar I.

In the 18th century, the counts of Egmont-Pignatelli spent their summers at the Château de Braine, which was known for its gardens by André Le Nôtre. Countess Septimanie d'Egmont a French salonist who invited guests like Rousseau to visit the château. After the French revolution, the château was demolished.

Population

See also
 Communes of the Aisne department

References

Communes of Aisne
Aisne communes articles needing translation from French Wikipedia